Gray Peak el.  is a prominent mountain peak in the Gallatin Range in the remote northwest section of Yellowstone National Park, Wyoming. There are no maintained trails to the summit.

See also
 Mountains and mountain ranges of Yellowstone National Park

Notes

Mountains of Wyoming
Mountains of Yellowstone National Park
Mountains of Park County, Wyoming